Uzumakiella is a genus of sea snails, marine gastropod mollusks in the family Tornidae.

Species
 Uzumakiella japonica Habe, 1958
 Uzumakiella natalensis Kilburn, 1977
 Uzumakiella solomonensis Rubio & Rolán, 2018

References

 Habe, T. (1958). Descriptions of ten new gastropod species. Venus. 20(1): 32-42. page(s): 33

Tornidae